The Metropolitan-Suburban Province was a three-member electoral province of the Western Australian Legislative Council, located in the metropolitan region of Perth. It was created by the Constitution Acts Amendment Act 1899, and became effective on 29 August 1900 following a special election to fill all three seats. Historically taking in many coastal and riverside areas in the western suburbs of Perth, it was considered safe for the Nationalist Party for most of its existence.

At the 1950 elections, it was renamed Suburban Province, losing Claremont and Subiaco and moving inland. In 1963–1964, electoral changes to the Legislative Council, which abolished the 10 three-member seats and created 15 two-member seats in their place, resulted in the seat's abolishment, with its area being divided between North-East Metropolitan Province and South-East Metropolitan Province.

Geography
The province was made up of several complete Legislative Assembly districts, which changed at each distribution. It had a more restrictive franchise than the Legislative Assembly, however, so not all voters in the corresponding Assembly districts were eligible to vote in the Council.

Representation

Members

References
 David Black (2014), The Western Australian Parliamentary Handbook (Twenty-Third Edition)

Former electoral provinces of Western Australia
1900 establishments in Australia
1965 disestablishments in Australia